Census Division No. 15 (Western Manitoba) is a census division located within the Westman Region of the province of Manitoba, Canada. Unlike in some other provinces, census divisions do not reflect the organization of local government in Manitoba. These areas exist solely for the purposes of statistical analysis and presentation; they have no government of their own. 

The economy of the region is based on agriculture, livestock and hog processing. The population of the area based on the 2006 census was 21,417. Also included in the division are the main reserves of the Birdtail Sioux First Nation, the Keeseekoowenin Ojibway First Nation, and the Rolling River First Nation.

Demographics 

Towns

 Minnedosa
 Neepawa

Unincorporated communities
 Birtle
 Erickson
 Hamiota
 Rapid City
 Shoal Lake
 St. Lazare

Municipalities
 Clanwilliam – Erickson
 Ellice – Archie
 Hamiota
 Harrison Park
 Minto – Odanah
 North Cypress-Langford (part in Division No. 7)
 Oakview
 Prairie View
 Rosedale
 Yellowhead

Reserves
 Birdtail Creek 57
 Gambler 63 (part)
 Keeseekoowenin 61
 Rolling River 67
 Rolling River 67B

References

External links
 Manitoba Community Profiles Western Manitoba

15